Skagaströnd, previously Höfðakaupstaður, is a municipality and village in the Northwestern Region of Iceland. It is situated on the western side of the Skagi peninsula, along the east coast of the Húnaflói ('Húna Bay'). The municipality was officially named Sveitarfélagið Skagaströnd on 1 September 2007. Skagaströnd is the only locality within the municipality.

Geography 
Sveitarfélagið Skagaströnd is bordered to the north and south by the municipality of Skagabyggð and to the east by Sveitarfélagið Skagafjörður. Measuring just , it is the sixth smallest municipality in Iceland by land area. 

On the northwest edge of the village is the Spákonufellshöfði ('Headland of the Spákonufell'), a  nature preserve and park. 

The nearest town is Blönduós,  to the south. Road 74, by which Skagaströnd is connected to Route 1, begins at Blönduós' eastern limit.

Name
The name Skagaströnd translates to 'Coast of the Skagi' or, literally, 'Coast of the Peninsula,' from the Icelandic skagi , meaning 'peninsula' – which also serves as the proper name of the peninsula on which the municipality is located – and strönd meaning 'coast, beach, shore.' The area historically hosted a number of verstöðvar, traditional fishing outposts and communal mooring places. The northern point of the Skagi is now situated in the northern portion of Skagabyggð and the Laxá í Refasveit forms the boundary between the municipality of Blönduósbær and the southern portion of Skagabyggð. Today, the name Skagaströnd is most often used to refer to the settlement and municipality, however, it is also used by Icelanders to refer to the traditional coastal area.

Twin towns 

Skagaströnd is twinned with:

  Lohja, Finland
  Växjö, Sweden

References

External links 

Official website 

Municipalities of Iceland
Populated places in Northwestern Region (Iceland)